This is a list of major political scandals in Poland:

 2001: corruption related to LFO scandal revealed, investigation ongoing as of 2009
 2002: Orlengate
 2002: Rywin affair
 2005: Wildstein list
 2005: allegations that USA had secret prisons (black sites) in Poland (and other countries) have arose, investigations and discussions in Poland continued to at least mid-2010s
 2007: Oleksy tapes made public

Political scandals in Poland
Poland
Scandals